Douglas Jackson Flett (13 October 1935 – 15 July 2019) was an Australian songwriter based in the UK, best known for his collaborations with longtime songwriting partner, Guy Fletcher. Collectively, the duo have also been known as Fletcher & Flett. Since the mid-1960s, they wrote and composed hit songs for many artists.

Career
Before moving to London in the early 1960s, Flett had worked in Sydney as a TV cameraman and in advertising. While in London, he was introduced to Guy Fletcher in 1965 by Shadows drummer Tony Meehan through a phone call, and the two met up. Since then, the duo wrote many songs for a wide number of artists including Elvis Presley, Ray Charles, Cliff Richard and Frankie Valli.

In 2016, they were each awarded a Gold Disc for their song "Just Pretend" due to sales of the Elvis Presley & Royal Philharmonic Orchestra compilation album The Wonder of You; the song features twice on the album, including a duet version with Helene Fischer.

It was announced that Flett had died on 15 July 2019 after a long illness. His daughter is the journalist and broadcaster Kathryn Flett.

References

External links
 

1935 births
2019 deaths
Australian songwriters
Australian lyricists
Australian emigrants to England
English people of Australian descent